Chasing Destiny is an American reality television docuseries whose aim is to find the next superstar girl group. June's Diary eventually was formed through the program.

The show was created by Kelly Rowland and also features dance choreographer and director Frank Gatson, Jr. Rowland is trying to assemble a musical group of Black girls based on talent and sisterhood, like the group she herself was once in, Destiny's Child. She has had auditions in three cities and has narrowed a list of 600 girls down to 15. Unlike the case with many other reality TV-made groups, Rowland seems invested in making this group a success.

Top 18

Episodes

References

2016 American television series debuts
2016 American television series endings
BET original programming